Alfredo Dallolio (21 June 1853 – 20 September 1952) was an Italian general and politician who served as the Minister of Munitions during the First World War.

Biography  
He graduated from the Turin military academy as a second lieutenant in 1872. Promoted to colonel in 1905, he served as artillery commander of the Padua army corps and was promoted in 1910 to major general for special merit. In 1911 he became inspector general of artillery and engineering and in 1914 promoted to divisional lieutenant general.

From July 1915 he served as undersecretary for Armaments and Munitions in the Ministry for War in the second Salandra government. From June 1916 he was first undersecretary and then, from 1917, an independent Minister of Arms and Munitions of the  Kingdom of Italy in the  Boselli and  Orlando  governments. He was appointed senator of the kingdom in 1917 by the king Victor Emmanuel III. He created a ‘central committee for industrial mobilization’ and a network of regional committees representing both arms industry manufacturers and workers. In 1918 he resigned because of corruption allegations. Afterwards he served as inspector general of artillery until 1920, when he was placed in reserves.

After being called back into service by the Mussolini government and promoted to corps lieutenant general on 1 February 1923, he was head of the  General Commissariat for War Production continuously until 28 August 1939, when he resigned in tacit protest against the imminent Italian entrance into World War II for which the essential means were lacking. His resignation made an impression in the military circles of the time because it was unequivocal testimony to the unpreparedness of the Army, but it did not lead to any practical consequences in the General Staff. He was not a member of the National Fascist Party and was exonerated in 1946 by the High Court of Justice for Sanctions against Fascism.

References

Bibliography
 Ruggero Zangrandi, Il lungo viaggio attraverso il fascismo. Milano, Feltrinelli, 1976

Italian people of World War I
1952 deaths
1853 births
20th-century Italian politicians
Italian military personnel of the Italo-Turkish War
Recipients of the Order of Saints Maurice and Lazarus
Italian generals